Pavel Scherbachenya (born 21 June 1996) is a Belarusian professional footballer who plays for Shakhtyor Petrikov.

References

External links 
 
 

1996 births
Living people
People from Salihorsk
Sportspeople from Minsk Region
Belarusian footballers
Association football goalkeepers
FC Shakhtyor Soligorsk players
FC Smorgon players
FC Molodechno players
FC Lida players
FC Shakhtyor Petrikov players